Majoor is a Dutch surname. Notable people with the surname include:

 Frank Majoor (born 1949), Dutch diplomat
 Martin Majoor (born 1960), Dutch typographer

Dutch-language surnames